The 2008 Alberta general election was held on March 3, 2008, to elect members of the Legislative Assembly of Alberta.

It was expected to be called early because the governing Progressive Conservatives held a leadership election on December 2, 2006, in which Ed Stelmach was elected to replace Ralph Klein as party leader and Premier. The election was called when Stelmach formally advised Lieutenant Governor Norman Kwong to dissolve the Legislature, which happened on February 4, 2008.

With 53% of the popular vote, the Progressive Conservatives won a decisive majority over the Liberal and other parties, despite early suggestions of a closer race.

The 2008 election had the lowest voter turnout in the province's history, with only 40.59% of eligible voters casting a ballot.

Results
The Progressive Conservatives increased their majority at the expense of all other parties in the legislature. The Tories also increased their share of the popular vote, and even though their share of the vote was still significantly less than it was in 2001, they managed to win just two fewer seats than they won in that election.  This was largely a result of their continued widespread support in rural areas, as well as divided opposition support in Calgary and Edmonton. The Conservative gains came mostly in and around Edmonton, where the party recorded its best results since 1982.

The Liberals held on to official opposition status but sustained a net loss of seven seats. Bucking historic trends, the party was reduced to only three seats in Edmonton, but was able to win five seats in Calgary (a net gain of one seat and the largest total won by that party in that city in the past 50 years). The Liberals also held their existing seat in Lethbridge to win a total of nine seats.

The other parties that were represented in the legislature also suffered losses on election night. The New Democrats lost two of their four Edmonton seats, and the Wildrose Alliance Party was shut out of the legislature as their leader Paul Hinman was narrowly defeated in his own constituency of Cardston-Taber-Warner.

For the first time in history, a majority of the Liberal caucus were from Calgary and the combined number of Liberal and NDP MLAs from Edmonton did not exceed the number of those two parties' MLAs from Calgary.

Summary

!rowspan="2" colspan="2" style="text-align:left;" |Party
!rowspan="2" style="text-align:left;" |Party leader
!rowspan="2" style="text-align:center;" |Number ofcandidates
!colspan="4" style="text-align:center;" |Seats
!colspan="3" style="text-align:center;" |Popular vote
|-
| style="text-align:center;" |2004
| style="text-align:center;" |Dissol.
| style="text-align:center;" |2008
| style="text-align:center;" |% Change
| style="text-align:center;" |#
| style="text-align:center;" |%
| style="text-align:center;" |Change (pp)

| style="text-align:left;" | Ed Stelmach
|83 ||621 ||60 ||72 ||+20% ||501,063 ||52.72 ||+5.92%

| style="text-align:left;" | Kevin Taft
|82 ||161 ||16 ||9 ||-43.8% ||251,158 ||26.43 ||-2.96%

| style="text-align:left;" | Brian Mason
|83 ||4 ||4 ||2 ||-50% ||80,578 ||8.48 ||-1.72%

| style="text-align:left;" | Paul Hinman
|61 ||1 ||1 ||- ||-100% ||64,407 ||6.78 ||-1.92%2

| style="text-align:left;" | George Read
|79 ||- ||- ||- ||- ||43,222 ||4.55 ||+1.80%

| style="text-align:left;" colspan=2 |Independent
|7 ||- ||1 ||- ||-100% ||7,635 ||0.80 ||+0.69%

| style="text-align:left;" |Len Skowronski
|8 ||- ||- ||- ||- ||2,043 ||0.21 ||-1.02%

| style="text-align:left;" |Bruce Hutton
|1 ||- ||- ||- ||- ||119 ||0.01 ||-0.52%

| style="text-align:left;" | Naomi Rankin
|2 ||- ||- ||- ||- ||96 ||0.01 ||xx

| style="text-align:left;" |Bruce Stubbs
|1 ||- ||- ||- ||- ||42 ||0.00 ||-0.28%

| style="text-align:left;" colspan="4" |Vacant
|1
|colspan=5| 
|-
| style="text-align:left;" colspan="3" |Total
!407 ||83 ||83 ||83 ||- ||950,363 ||100.00 || 
|}
Notes:
1 Liberal Chris Kibermanis originally had a five-vote margin over Progressive Conservative Thomas Lukaszuk. A judicial recount on January 24, 2005, determined Thomas Lukaszuk the winner.
2 Results change is compared to the Alberta Alliance in 2004.

Vote and seat summaries

Policy and other major announcements

Alberta Liberal Party

Immediate elimination of health care premiums
Increasing per capita spending on policy in Calgary from $16 to $20
Re-legislation of tuition policy so it is made in open session
Implementation of a public pharmacare program
Using tobacco taxes, spend approximately $200 million to create a Community Wellness Fund which will seek to expand Family & Community Support Services and fund healthy living and lifestyle programs
Redirect the $250 million Natural Gas Rebate Program towards incentives for energy efficiency
Triple funding for the Alberta Foundation for the Arts
Increase the number of health care workers
Investment of 30% of all natural resource revenues in:
investment in the Heritage Fund so that income taxes can remain permanently low
elimination of the infrastructure deficit by 2014
establishment of an uncapped endowment for post-secondary education
establishment of a $500 million endowment fund for arts, social sciences, and humanities
Elimination of the education section of the property tax for seniors (approx. $700 a year)
Increasing the tax credit for seniors' caregivers to $9,355 from $4,355.
Making both Calgary and Edmonton into independent cities via a "Big Cities" Charter
 Hiring 300 more police officers for Calgary and Edmonton
 Fixed election dates

Cost: Net costs are zero as a result of re-allocating existing dollars and increased royalty revenues.

New Democratic Party of Alberta

Making life affordable
 Create 4,000 new child care spaces.
 Cap rates of $25/day ($500/month) for infant care and $9/day ($180/month) for after school care.
 Regulate after-school care for children.
 Increase start-up grants for daycare centres and day homes.
 Provide additional sustainable grants to day cares to increase wages for childcare workers.
 Introduce rent controls.
 Introduce limits on condominium conversions.
Full value royalties
 Follow example set by Alaska and replace the royalty system.
 Create an all-party, special committee of the legislature to investigate royalties and report back in three months.
 Add a variable royalty structure that would increase the royalty revenues when oil prices pass a peak threshold.
 Increase royalties on other non-renewable resources  such as coal.
Green energy plan
 Create a green energy fund that will receive $2 billion a year primarily through enhanced royalties. Use that money  to fund energy efficient retro-fitting and alternative energy production systems for individual houses and building.
 Fund alternative power generation projects such as solar and wind farms.
 Place hard caps on greenhouse gas emissions with penalties for companies that exceed targets — details to be worked out later.
 Slow down the pace of development
Big dollar signs out of politics
 End campaign contributions from unions and corporations.
 Table legislation binding all leadership and nomination contests to the same disclosure rules and donation limits of political parties.
 Immediately end health-care premiums.
 Create a new pharmaceutical agency to purchase drugs  in bulk, negotiate prices with drug companies and find less costly options to brand-name drugs.
 Roll back tuition levels to 1999–2000 levels.
 Cap interest for student loans at prime.
 Invest $100 million in student housing immediately.
 Eliminate fees and fund-raising for learning essentials.
 Phase out funding for private schools.
 Hire 800 additional police officers
 Mandate basic value-added and upgrading for all bitumen mined in Alberta to be done in the province.
 Add an interim per barrel tax on all bitumen exported outside the province.
 Establish a bitumen pricing system.
 Start a public automobile insurance system.
 Provide stable funding for non-profit First Nation and Metis agencies.
 Tie AISH and social assistance rates to a market basket measure.
 Introduce $30 million in new funding for the Alberta Foundation for the Arts.

Cost: $477 million surplus, based on increased royalty rates, bitumen royalty premium and reverse corporate tax cuts.

Progressive Conservative Party of Alberta
Elimination of health care premiums over four years
Increase the number of health care workers
Construct 18 new schools in Calgary and Edmonton, including health focused schools
$6 billion a year to build and improve urban transit, highways, schools, parks and seniors facilities
Tax credits to businesses and homeowners who renovate to utilize energy efficient appliances
Reduce greenhouse gas emissions by 200 megatons by 2050
Increase oil and gas revenue by $2 billion
Introduce royalty that would increase with the price of oil
Create a secretariat for action on homelessness
Create a new cultural policy that includes recreation and sport along with arts and performance
Double the tax credit for those supporting dependent family members

Cost: Total commitments represent 4.2 per cent of the budget for 2008–09 or $1.5 billion.

Wildrose Alliance Party of Alberta
Immediately eliminate health care premiums
Raise the basic personal income tax exemption to $20,000
Cut the provincial corporate tax rate from 10% to 8%
Allow income splitting for taxpayers who care for dependents in times of medical or other crisis
Direct savings from slowing spending growth to the Heritage Fund so that personal income taxes can eventually be eliminated
Allow governance and service delivery at the municipal and community levels as much as possible
As part of the party's universal health care plan, implement a pilot program in one of the smaller health regions that will be modelled after funding following the patients rather than the per capita funding currently in place today.  Similarly, establish a school choice voucher pilot.
Provide significant debt relief to Alberta-trained medical professionals who commit to practising in the province at least five years
Establish fixed election dates, allow for citizen initiatives via referendums, and enact the right to recall elected officials

Costs: Cost of promises not released.

Alberta Greens

Green tax shift (i.e. lower income and business taxes in exchange for higher resource taxes)
Community-based development
Balanced budgets and fiscal responsibility
Recovery of waste energy through co-generation
Assessing royalty waste on a reservoir by reservoir basis
Provide low interest loans to businesses for energy retrofits
Provide no interest loans to homes for energy conservation
Ban the use of cosmetic pesticides
Increase spending in the Child Welfare Department
Pass a Protected Lands Act that will clarify different land uses. The act will include:
Increase land designated as protected
Protect the Yellowstone to Yukon (Y2Y) corridor
Authority and resources to enforce the legislation for protected areas officers
Increasing the supply of affordable housing
More housing cooperatives and co-housing type developments
Ensuring units are maintained by organizations that have a vested interest in sustaining them
Working with the municipalities to make urban development plans that preserve farmland
Investing in public transit
Ensuring a continued supply of fresh water

Leader's statement

Results by region

1 "Edmonton" corresponds to only the city of Edmonton. (Only the ridings whose names begin with "Edmonton".) The four suburban ridings around the city as listed below are grouped with central Alberta in this table.

Opinion polls

Target ridings
The following is a list of ridings that were narrowly lost by the indicated party in the 2004 election.  For instance, under the Liberal column are the nine seats in which they came closest to winning but did not.  Listed is the name of the riding, followed by the party which was victorious (in parentheses) and the margin, in terms of percentage of the vote, by which the party lost.

These ridings were likely targeted by the specified party because the party lost them by a very slim margin in the 2004 election.

Up to ten are shown, with a maximum margin of victory of 15%.

* Indicates incumbent not running again.

MLAs not running again

Liberal
Maurice Tougas, Edmonton-Meadowlark
NDP
Raj Pannu, Edmonton-Strathcona

Progressive Conservative
Tony Abbott, Drayton Valley-Calmar
Mike Cardinal, Athabasca-Redwater
Harvey Cenaiko, Calgary-Buffalo
David Coutts, Livingstone-Macleod
Victor Doerksen, Red Deer-South
Denis Ducharme, Bonnyville-Cold Lake
Clint Dunford, Lethbridge-West
Gordon Graydon, Grande Prairie-Wapiti
Carol Haley, Airdrie-Chestermere
Denis Herard, Calgary-Egmont
LeRoy Johnson, Wetaskiwin-Camrose
Rob Lougheed, Strathcona
Greg Melchin, Calgary-North West
Richard Magnus, Calgary-North Hill
Lyle Oberg, Strathmore-Brooks
Hung Pham, Calgary-Montrose
Ivan Strang, West Yellowhead
Gary Mar, Calgary-Mackay

Timeline
November 19, 2005 Paul Hinman, Cardston-Taber-Warner MLA is elected leader of the Alberta Alliance Party replacing Randy Thorsteinson at a leadership convention in Red Deer, Alberta.
March 29, 2006 Premier Ralph Klein is given a 55% leadership review, he later announced his retirement for the fall of 2006.
September 20, 2006 Premier Ralph Klein gives notice to the Progressive Conservatives, announces he will leave when a new leader is picked.
November 23, 2006 Dan Backs is removed from the Liberal caucus and is forced to sit as an Independent
December 15, 2006 Ed Stelmach replaces Ralph Klein as premier.
January 15, 2007 Former Premier Ralph Klein and former Deputy Premier Shirley McClellan resign their legislature seats.
June 12, 2007 By-elections are held in the seats vacated on January 15. While Jack Hayden easily holds the Drumheller-Stettler riding for the Progressive Conservatives, Craig Cheffins takes Premier Klein's old seat, Calgary Elbow, for the Liberals.
November 3, 2007 Len Skowronski is elected Leader of Social Credit replacing Lavern Ahlstrom
December 3, 2007 Gary Mar resigns his seat of Calgary Mackay after he was appointed as Alberta's representative to Washington, D.C.
January 19, 2008 The Wildrose Party of Alberta and the Alberta Alliance Party merge to form the Wildrose Alliance Party of Alberta.
February 4, 2008 The writ is dropped.
February 21, 2008 Stelmach, Taft, Mason, and Hinman square off in a leaders' debate.
March 3, 2008, 8:22 p.m.: CTV Calgary declares a PC majority barely twenty minutes after the polls close.  A CTV reporter asks Ed Stelmach about it, but the Premier has no real answer.
8:29 p.m.: Less than half an hour after the polls close, and less than 25 minutes after the first polling station reports, CBC News declares a PC majority; Ed Stelmach begins a brief speech thanking party workers in Calgary while the CBC anchor is making the declaration.
9:45 p.m.: Kevin Taft concedes victory. Despite the poor result, he announces his intention to remain party leader.
10:36 p.m.: Ed Stelmach formally claims victory in Edmonton.

Nominated candidates

Names in bold indicate party leaders and cabinet ministers.

Northern Alberta

|-
|bgcolor=whitesmoke|Athabasca-Redwater
||
|Jeff Johnson7,484 (67.99%)
|
|Bill Bonko1,379 (12.53%)
|
|Peter Opryshko1,225 (11.13%)
|
|Mike Radojcic517 (4.69%)
|
|Phyllis Penchuk403 (3.66%)
|
|
||
|Mike Cardinal
|-
|bgcolor=whitesmoke|Barrhead-Morinville-Westlock
||
|Ken Kowalski8,312 (70.26%)
|
|Leslie Penny1,804 (15.25%)
|
|Rod Olstad927 (7.83%)
|
|
|
|Dan Evans479 (4.05%)
|
|Carl Haugen (SC)309 (2.61%)
||
|Ken Kowalski
|-
|bgcolor=whitesmoke|Bonnyville-Cold Lake
||
|Genia Leskiw4,437 (75.54%)
|
|Justin Yassoub698 (11.88%)
|
|Jason Sloychuk389 (6.62%)
|
|
|
|Jennifer Brown350 (5.96%)
|
|
||
|Denis Ducharme
|-
|bgcolor=whitesmoke|Dunvegan-Central Peace
||
|Hector Goudreau4,147 (51.99%)
|
|Bob Woken288 (3.61%)
|
|Nathan Macklin1,202 (15.07%)
|
|Dale Lueken2,339 (29.33%)
|
|
|
|
||
|Hector Goudreau
|-
|bgcolor=whitesmoke|Fort McMurray-Wood Buffalo
||
|Guy Boutilier4,519 (63.41%)
|
|Ross Jacobs1,758 (24.67%)
|
|Mel Kraley550 (7.72%)
|
|
|
|Reginald (Reg) Normore300 (4.21%)
|
|
||
|Guy Boutilier
|-
|bgcolor=whitesmoke|Grande Prairie Smoky
||
|Mel Knight4,769 (59.44%)
|
|John Croken1,089 (13.57%)
|
|Neil Peacock832 (10.37%)
|
|Todd Loewen1,049 (13.07%)
|
|Rebecca Villebrun285 (3.55%)
|
|
||
|Mel Knight
|-
|bgcolor=whitesmoke|Grande Prairie Wapiti
||
|Wayne Drysdale5,145 (66.70%)
|
|Augustine Ebinu1,304 (16.90%)
|
|Manuella Campbell829 (10.75%)
|
|
|
|Art Proctor436 (5.65%)
|
|
||
|Gordon Graydon
|-
|bgcolor=whitesmoke|Lac La Biche-St. Paul
||
|Ray Danyluk6,527 (71.28%)
|
|Alex Broadbent1,627 (17.77%)
|
|Della Drury1,003 (10.95%)
|
|
|
|
|
|
||
|Ray Danyluk
|-
|bgcolor=whitesmoke|Lesser Slave Lake
||
|Pearl Calahasen3,384 (65.18%)
|
|Steve Noskey1,109 (21.36%)
|
|Habby Sharkawi426 (8.20%)
|
|
|
|Bonnie Raho273 (5.26%)
|
|
||
|Pearl Calahasen
|-
|bgcolor=whitesmoke|Peace River
||
|Frank Oberle3,265 (64.63%)
|
|
|
|Adele Boucher Rymhs1,248 (24.70%)
|
|Georg Beinart539 (10.67%)
|
|
|
|
||
|Frank Oberle
|}

Western and Central Alberta

|-
|bgcolor=whitesmoke|Banff-Cochrane
||
|Janis Tarchuk4,727 (49.34%)
|
|Patricia K. Robertson2,753 (28.74%)
|
|Anne Wilson575 (6.00%)
|
|
|
|Dan Cunin1,353 (14.12%)
|
|Zrinko Amerl (Ind.)172 (1.80%)
||
|Janis Tarchuk
|-
|bgcolor=whitesmoke|Drayton Valley-Calmar
||
|Diana McQueen5,931 (58.74%)
|
|Norma Block846 (8.38%)
|
|Luanne Bannister390 (3.86%)
|
|Dean Schmale1,053 (10.43%)
|
|Edwin Erickson1,877 (18.59%)
|
|
||
||Tony Abbott
|-
|bgcolor=whitesmoke|Foothills-Rocky View
||
|Ted Morton6,916 (57.41%)
|
|Herb Coburn2,200 (18.26%)
|
|Ricardo de Menezes196 (1.63%)
|
|Joseph McMaster1,797 (14.92%)
|
|Larry Ashmore937 (7.78%)
|
|
||
|Ted Morton
|-
|bgcolor=whitesmoke|Innisfail-Sylvan Lake
||
|Luke Ouellette6,967 (62.82%)
|
|Garth Davis1,539 (13.88%)
|
|Tophie Davies702 (6.33%)
|
|Wayne Edmundson1,215 (10.96%)
|
|Lisa Grant545 (4.91%)
|
|Anthony Haggarty (Ind)122 (1.10%)
||
|Luke Ouellette
|-
|bgcolor=whitesmoke|Olds-Didsbury-Three Hills
||
|Richard Marz7,837 (64.06%)
|
|Tony Vonesch1,038 (8.49%)
|
|Andy Davies268 (2.19%)
|
|Curt Engel2,572 (21.03%)
|
|Kate Haddow518 (4.23%)
|
|
||
|Richard Marz
|-
|bgcolor=whitesmoke|Red Deer North
||
|Mary Anne Jablonski4,715 (57.94%)
|
|Richard Farrand1,770 (21.75%)
|
|Shawn Nielsen560 (6.88%)
|
|Urs Lehner630 (7.74%)
|
|Rueben Tschetter463 (5.69%)
|
| 
||
|Mary Anne Jablonski
|-
|bgcolor=whitesmoke|Red Deer South
||
|Cal Dallas7,139 (56.18%)
|
|Diane Kubanek3,414 (26.86%)
|
|Teresa Bryanton597 (4.70%)
|
|Ed Klop949 (7.47%)
|
|Evan Bedford609 (4.79%)
|
|
||
|Victor Doerksen
|-
|bgcolor=whitesmoke|Rocky Mountain House
||
|Ty Lund6,188 (62.30%)
|
|Norm McDougall849 (8.55%)
|
|Jorge Souza279 (2.81%)
|
|Fanie van Heerden1,156 (11.64%)
|
|Jennifer Ripley699 (7.03%)
|
|Wilf Tricker (SC)643 (6.47%) Bruce Hutton (SPA)119 (1.20%)
||
|Ty Lund
|-
|bgcolor=whitesmoke|Stony Plain
||
|Fred Lindsay8,467 (63.38%)
|
|Bill Fraser2,552 (19.10%)
|
|Shelina Brown976 (7.31%)
|
|Sandy Pariseau793 (5.94%)
|
|Nora Shea571 (4.27%)
|
|
||
|Fred Lindsay
|-
|bgcolor=whitesmoke|West Yellowhead
||
|Robin Campbell4,206 (53.83%)
|
|Lisa Higgerty1,932 (24.72%)
|
|Ken Kuzminski1,054 (13.49%)
|
|Earle Cunningham326 (4.17%)
|
|Scott Pickett296 (3.79%)
|
| 
||
|Ivan Strang
|-
|bgcolor=whitesmoke|Whitecourt-Ste. Anne
||
|George VanderBurg6,019 (60.60%)
|
|Mike Grey1,106 (11.14%)
|
|Leah Redmond661 (6.65%)
|
|Link Byfield2,146 (21.61%)
|
| 
|
| 
||
|George VanderBurg
|}

East Central Alberta

|-
|bgcolor=whitesmoke|Battle River-Wainwright
||
|Doug Griffiths7,968 (78.57%)
|
|Horst Schreiber1,260 (12.42%)
|
|Doris Bannister431 (4.25%)
|
|
|
|Will Munsey483 (4.76%)
|
|
||
|Doug Griffiths
|-
|bgcolor=whitesmoke|Drumheller-Stettler
||
|Jack Hayden6,986 (68.90%)
|
|Tom Dooley1,463 (14.43%)
|
|Richard Bough276 (2.72%)
|
|Dave France1,062 (10.47%)
|
|Amanda Bolton353 (3.48%)
|
|
||
|Jack Hayden
|-
|bgcolor=whitesmoke|Fort Saskatchewan-Vegreville
||
|Ed Stelmach11,169 (78.13%)
|
|Earl J. Woods1,343 (9.39%)
|
|Clayton Marsden1,233 (8.63%)
|
|
|
|Ryan Scheie551 (3.85%)
|
|
||
|Ed Stelmach
|-
|bgcolor=whitesmoke|Lacombe-Ponoka
||
|Ray Prins8,202 (58.18%)
|
|Edith McPhedran1,200 (8.51%)
|
|Steve Bradshaw560 (3.97%)
|
|Daniel Freisen911 (6.46%)
|
|Joe Anglin3,226 (22.88%)
|
|
||
|Ray Prins
|-
|bgcolor=whitesmoke|Leduc-Beaumont-Devon
||
|George Rogers9,045 (64.91%)
|
|Joyce Assen2,329 (16.72%)
|
|Lisa Erickson1,057 (7.59%)
|
|Sharon MacLise1,008 (7.23%)
|
|Kevin Colton495 (3.55%)
|
|
||
|George Rogers
|-
|bgcolor=whitesmoke|Vermilion-Lloydminster
||
|Lloyd Snelgrove7,013 (80.75%)
|
|Robert Sawatzky826 (9.51%)
|
|Wendy Myshak482 (5.55%)
|
|
|
|Ngaio Hotte364 (4.19%)
|
| 
||
|Lloyd Snelgrove
|-
|bgcolor=whitesmoke|Wetaskiwin-Camrose
||
|Verlyn Olson7,726 (65.89%)
|
|Keith Elliott1,646 (14.04%)
|
|Sarah Mowat1,078 (9.19%)
|
|Tyler Knelsen818 (6.98%)
|
|Midge Lambert458 (3.90%)
|
|
||
|LeRoy Johnson
|}

Central Edmonton

|-
|bgcolor=whitesmoke|Edmonton Beverly Clareview
||
|Tony Vandermeer4,182 (39.63%)
|
|Dawit Isaac1,996 (18.92%)
|
|Ray Martin3,845 (36.44%)
|
|Brian Dell289 (2.74%)
|
|Frederick Pivot183 (1.73%)
|
|Robin Porteous (SC)57 (0.54%)
||
|Ray Martin
|-
|bgcolor=whitesmoke|Edmonton Centre
|
|Bill Donahue3,291 (29.36%)
||
|Laurie Blakeman5,042 (44.98%)
|
|Deron Bilous2,163 (19.30%)
|
|James Iverson200 (1.78%)
|
|David Parker472 (4.21%)
|
|Margaret Saunter (AP)42 (0.37%)
||
|Laurie Blakeman
|-
|bgcolor=whitesmoke|Edmonton-Glenora
||
|Heather Klimchuk4,604 (39.90%)
|
|Bruce Miller4,508 (39.07%)
|
|Arlene Chapman1,743 (15.11%)
|
|Elden Van Hauwaert275 (2.38%)
|
|Peter Johnston408 (3.54%)
|
|
||
|Bruce Miller
|-
|bgcolor=whitesmoke|Edmonton Gold Bar
|
|David Dorward5,261 (37.61%)
||
||Hugh MacDonald6,279 (44.89%)
|
|Sherry McKibben1,923 (13.75%)
|
|
|
|David Zylstra525 (3.75%)
|
|
||
|Hugh MacDonald
|-
|bgcolor=whitesmoke|Edmonton Highlands-Norwood
|
|Andrew Beniuk2,978 (31.92%)
|
|Brad Smith1,132 (12.13%)
||
|Brian Mason4,754 (50.95%)
|
|Travis Loewen245 (2.63%)
|
|Mohamad Maie221 (2.37%)
|
|
||
|Brian Mason
|-
|bgcolor=whitesmoke|Edmonton Mill Creek
||
|Gene Zwozdesky6,857 (50.78%)
|
|Aman Gill4,058 (30.05%)
|
|Stephen Anderson1,822 (13.49%)
|
|
|
|Glen Argan726 (5.38%)
|
|Naomi Rankin (Com)41 (0.30%)
||
|Gene Zwozdesky
|-
|bgcolor=whitesmoke|Edmonton-Mill Woods
||
|Carl Benito4,752 (43.87%)
|
|Weslyn Mather3,996 (36.89%)
|
|Christina Gray1,474 (13.61%)
|
|Robert Leddy321 (2.95%)
|
|David Hruska289 (2.68%)
|
|
||
|Weslyn Mather
|-
|bgcolor=whitesmoke|Edmonton Riverview
|
|Wendy Andrews5,171 (35.03%)
||
|Kevin Taft7,471 (50.61%)
|
|Erica Bullwinkle1,284 (8.70%)
|
|Kyle Van Hauwaert329 (2.23%)
|
|Cameron Wakefield506 (3.43%)
|
|
||
|Kevin Taft
|-
|bgcolor=whitesmoke|Edmonton Rutherford
||
|Fred Horne5,225 (42.49%)
|
|Rick Miller5,167 (42.02%)
|
|Mike Butler1,178 (9.58%)
|
|John Baloun379 (3.08%)
|
|Kate Wyrostok348 (2.83%)
|
|
||
|Rick Miller
|-
|bgcolor=whitesmoke|Edmonton Strathcona
|
|T.J. Keil3,031 (25.50%)
|
|Tim Vant2,452 (20.63%)
||
|Rachel Notley5,862 (49.32%)
|
|
|
|Adrian Cole540 (4.55%)
|
|
||
|Raj Pannu
|}

Suburban Edmonton and environs

|-
|bgcolor=whitesmoke|Edmonton-Calder
||
|Doug Elniski4,557 (40.86%)
|
|Jim Kane1,839 (16.49%)
|
|David Eggen4,356 (39.05%)
|
|
|
|Mike Brown402 (3.60%)
|
| 
||
|David Eggen
|-
|bgcolor=whitesmoke|Edmonton Castle Downs
||
|Thomas Lukaszuk7,159 (51.55%)
|
|Chris Kibermanis5,090 (36.65%)
|
|Ali Haymour1,341 (9.66%)
|
|
|
|Bob Reckhow297 (2.14%)
|
|
||
|Thomas Lukaszuk
|-
|bgcolor=whitesmoke|Edmonton Decore
||
|Janice Sarich4,577 (45.71%)
|
|Bill Bonko3,895 (38.89%)
|
|Sidney Sadik1,301 (12.99%)
|
|
|
|Trey Capenhurst241 (2.41%)
|
|
||
|Bill Bonko
|-
|bgcolor=whitesmoke |Edmonton Ellerslie
||
|Naresh Bhardwaj4,581 (41.90%)
|
|Bharat Agnihotri3,592 (32.86%)
|
|Marilyn Assheton-Smith1,891 (17.30%)
|
|Krista Leddy471 (4.31%)
|
|Paul Boos335 (3.06%)
|
|Cheryl Ullah (SC)62 (0.57%)
||
|Bharat Agnihotri
|-
|bgcolor=whitesmoke |Edmonton Manning
||
|Peter Sandhu4,107 (35.79%)
|
|Sandeep Dhir2,260 (19.70%)
|
|Rick Murti2,307 (20.11%)
|
|Phil Gamache289 (2.52%)
|
|Odette Boily235 (2.05%)
|
|Dan Backs (Ind.)2,275 (19.83%)
||
|Dan Backs
|-
|bgcolor=whitesmoke |Edmonton McClung
||
|David Xiao7,173 (48.94%)
|
|Mo Elsalhy5,947 (40.57%)
|
|Bridget Stirling924 (6.30%)
|
|Kristine Jassman272 (1.86%)
|
|Bryan Wyrostok342 (2.33%)
|
|
||
|Mo Elsalhy
|-
|bgcolor=whitesmoke |Edmonton Meadowlark
||
|Raj Sherman6,174 (54.83%)
|
|Debbie Cavaliere3,423 (30.40%)
|
|Pascal Ryffel1,010 (8.97%)
|
|Richard Guyon306 (2.72%)
|
|Amanda Doyle347 (3.08%)
|
|
||
|Maurice Tougas
|-
|bgcolor=whitesmoke |Edmonton-Whitemud
||
|David Hancock12,054 (58.47%)
|
|Nancy Cavanaugh6,997 (33.94%)
|
|Hana Razga1,023 (4.96%)
|
|
|
|Valerie Kennedy543 (2.63%)
|
|
||
|David Hancock
|-
|bgcolor=whitesmoke |Sherwood Park
||
|Iris Evans9,312 (63.14%)
|
|Louise Rogers3,843 (26.06%)
|
|Katharine Hay904 (6.13%)
|
|
|
|Rick Hoines689 (4.67%)
|
|
||
|Iris Evans
|-
|bgcolor=whitesmoke |Spruce Grove-Sturgeon-St. Albert
||
|Doug Horner9,369 (60.83%)
|
|Ray Boudreau4,528 (29.40%)
|
|Peter Cross960 (6.23%)
|
|
|
|Allan West545 (3.54%)
|
|
||
|Doug Horner
|-
|bgcolor=whitesmoke |St. Albert
||
|Ken Allred8,403 (54.09%)
|
|Jack Flaherty5,598 (36.03%)
|
|Katy Campbell959 (6.17%)
|
|
|
|Ross Vincent576 (3.71%)
|
| 
||
|Jack Flaherty
|-
|bgcolor=whitesmoke|Strathcona
||
|Dave Quest9,951 (66.19%)
|
|Jon Friel2,995 (19.92%)
|
|Denny Holmwood911 (6.06%)
|
|
|
|Kate Harrington763 (5.07%)
|
|Gordon Barrett (SC)415 (2.76%)
||
|Rob Lougheed
|}

Southern Alberta

|-
|bgcolor=whitesmoke|Airdrie-Chestermere
||
|Rob Anderson9,374 (62.58%)
|
|John Burke1,973 (13.17%)
|
|Bryan Young609 (4.07%)
|
|Jeff Willerton2,362 (15.77%)
|
|David Brandreth660 (4.41%)
|
|
||
|Carol Haley
|-
|bgcolor=whitesmoke|Cardston-Taber-Warner
||
|Broyce Jacobs4,374 (46.02%)
|
|Ron Hancock436 (4.59%)
|
|Suzanne Sirias190 (2.00%)
|
|Paul Hinman4,325 (45.50%)
|
|Billy Turner180 (1.89%)
|
| 
||
|Paul Hinman
|-
|bgcolor=whitesmoke|Cypress-Medicine Hat
||
|Leonard Mitzel5,640 (63.34%)
|
|Dick Mastel2,023 (22.72%)
|
|Manuel Martinez347 (3.90%)
|
|Dan Pierson679 (7.63%)
|
|Bright Pride215 (2.41%)
|
|
||
|Leonard Mitzel
|-
|bgcolor=whitesmoke|Highwood
||
|George Groeneveld7,715 (65.11%)
|
|Stan Shedd1,647 (13.90%)
|
|Carolyn Boulton391 (3.30%)
|
|Daniel Doherty1,405 (11.86%)
|
|John Barret691 (5.83%)
|
|
||
||George Groeneveld
|-
|bgcolor=whitesmoke|Lethbridge East
|
|Jason Herasemluk4,715 (39.21%)
||
|Bridget Pastoor5,582 (46.42%)
|
|Tom Moffatt687 (5.71%)
|
|Grant Shaw748 (6.22%)
|
|Helen McMenamin292 (2.44%)
|
|
||
|Bridget Pastoor
|-
|bgcolor=whitesmoke|Lethbridge West
||
|Greg Weadick5,002 (43.68%)
|
|Bal Boora4,022 (35.13%)
|
|James Moore1,179 (10.30%)
|
|Matt Fox855 (7.47%)
|
|Brennan Tilley392 (3.42%)
|
|
||
|Clint Dunford
|-
|bgcolor=whitesmoke|Little Bow
||
|Barry McFarland5,150 (58.06%)
|
|Everett Tanis1,080 (12.18%)
|
|Duane Petluk322 (3.63%)
|
|Kevin Kinahan2,051 (23.12%)
|
|Marie Read267 (3.01%)
|
|
||
|Barry McFarland
|-
|bgcolor=whitesmoke|Livingstone-Macleod
||
|Evan Berger6,037 (64.18%)
|
|Mike Judd1,534 (16.31%)
|
|Phil Burpee476 (5.06%)
|
|Jack Macleod988 (10.50%)
|
|Bryan Hunt371 (3.95%)
|
|
||
|David Coutts
|-
|bgcolor=whitesmoke|Medicine Hat
||
|Rob Renner5,388 (51.18%)
|
|Karen Charlton3,625 (34.43%)
|
|Diana Arnott484 (4.60%)
|
|Clint Rabb746 (7.08%)
|
|Karen Kraus285 (2.71%)
|
|
||
|Rob Renner
|-
|bgcolor=whitesmoke|Strathmore-Brooks
||
|Arno Doerksen7,623 (74.55%)
|
|Gerry Hart991 (9.69%)
|
|Brian Stokes313 (3.06%)
|
|Amanda Shehata935 (9.14%)
|
|Chris Bayford362 (3.55%)
|
|
||
|Lyle Oberg
|}

Suburban Calgary

|-
|bgcolor=whitesmoke|Calgary-Bow
||
|Alana DeLong6,687 (45.16%)
|
|Greg Flanagan5,173 (34.93%)
|
|Teale Phelps Bondaroff507 (3.42%)
|
|Barry Holizki1,425 (9.62%)
|
|Randy Weeks845 (5.71%)
|
|Len Skowronski (SC)171 (1.16%)
||
|Alana DeLong
|-
|bgcolor=whitesmoke|Calgary-Cross
||
|Yvonne Fritz4,004 (56.82%)
|
|Rob Reinhold1,567 (22.24%)
|
|Shelina Hassanali476 (6.75%)
|
|Gordon Huth605 (8.59%)
|
|Susan Stratton395 (5.60%)
|
| 
||
|Yvonne Fritz
|-
|bgcolor=whitesmoke|Calgary-Foothills
||
|Len Webber6,088 (48.20%)
|
|Mike Robinson4,909 (38.86%)
|
|Stephanie Sundburg251 (1.99%)
|
|Kevin Legare972 (7.70%)
|
|Ian Groll411 (3.25%)
|
| 
||
|Len Webber
|-
|bgcolor=whitesmoke|Calgary-Fort
||
|Wayne Cao4,123 (49.81%)
|
|Carole Oliver1,770 (21.39%)
|
|Julie Hrdlicka1,178 (14.23%)
|
|Travis Chase715 (8.64%)
|
|J. Mark Taylor491 (5.93%)
|
|
||
|Wayne Cao
|-
|bgcolor=whitesmoke|Calgary-Hays
||
|Arthur Johnston6,968 (54.23%)
|
|Bill Kurtze3,586 (27.91%)
|
|Tyler Kinch366 (2.84%)
|
|Devin Cassidy1,366 (10.63%)
|
|Keeley Bruce564 (4.39%)
|
| 
||
|Arthur Johnston
|-
|bgcolor=whitesmoke|Calgary-Lougheed
||
|David Rodney7,190 (52.51%)
|
|Lori Czerwinski3,926 (28.68%)
|
|Clint Marko336 (2.45%)
|
|Derrick Jacobson1,620 (11.83%)
|
|Bernie Amell520 (3.80%)
|
|Gordon Laurie (Ind.)100 (0.73%)
||
|David Rodney
|-
|bgcolor=whitesmoke|Calgary-Mackay
||
|Teresa Woo-Paw6,247 (48.40%)
|
|Tianna Melnyk4,048 (31.36%)
|
|Daena Diduck426 (3.30%)
|
|Rob Gregory1,609 (12.46%)
|
|Ryan Smith578 (4.48%)
|
|
|
|Vacant
|-
|bgcolor=whitesmoke|Calgary-McCall
|
|Shiraz Shariff4,161 (43.16%)
||
|Darshan Kang4,279 (44.38%)
|
|Preet Sihota275 (2.85%)
|
|Ina Given542 (5.62%)
|
|Heather Brocklesby385 (3.99%)
|
| 
||
|Shiraz Shariff
|-
|bgcolor=whitesmoke|Calgary-Montrose
||
|Manmeet Bhullar2,627 (34.45%)
|
|Michael Embaie1,396 (18.31%)
|
|Al Brown512 (6.71%)
|
|Said Abdulbaki818 (10.73%)
|
|Fred Clemens262 (3.44%)
|
|Ron Leech (Ind)2,010 (26.36%)
||
|Hung Pham
|-
|bgcolor=whitesmoke|Calgary-North West
||
|Lindsay Blackett8,415 (46,21%)
|
|Dale Martin D'Silva5,552 (30.49%)
|
|Colin Anderson637 (3.50%)
|
|Chris Jukes2,703 (14.85%)
|
|George Read902 (4.95%)
|
| 
||
|Greg Melchin
|-
|bgcolor=whitesmoke|Calgary-Shaw
||
|Cindy Ady7,010 (58.12%)
|
|John Roggeveen 2,958 (24.53%)
|
|Jenn Carlson334 (2.77%)
|
|Richard  P. Dur1,268 (10.51%)
|
|Jennifer Oss-Saunders491 (4.07%_
|
|
||
|Cindy Ady
|-
|bgcolor=whitesmoke|Calgary-West
||
|Ron Liepert8,428 (47.97%)
|
|Beth Gignac5,693 (32.41%)
|
|Chantelle Dubois401 (2.28%)
|
|Bob Babcock2,273 (12.94%)
|
|James Kohut773 (4.40%)
|
| 
||
|Ron Liepert
|}

Central Calgary

|-
|bgcolor=whitesmoke|Calgary-Buffalo
|
|Sean Chu3,646 (38.85%)
||
|Kent Hehr4,583 (48.83%)
|
|Robert Lawrence387 (4.12%)
|
|
|
|Stephen Ricketts611 (6.51%)
|
|Antoni Grochowski (SC)158 (1.69%)
||
|Harvey Cenaiko
|-
|bgcolor=whitesmoke|Calgary-Currie
|
|Arthur Kent4,552 (37.27%)
||
|Dave Taylor5,564 (45.56%)
|
|Marc Power531 (4.35%)
|
|Ken Mazeroll670 (5.49%)
|
|Graham MacKenzie896 (7.34%)
|
|
||
|Dave Taylor
|-
|bgcolor=whitesmoke|Calgary-East
||
|Moe Amery4,583 (53.85%)
|
|Bill Harvey2,433 (28.59%)
|
|Christopher Dovey425 (4.99%)
|
|Mike McCraken681 (8.00%)
|
|Ross Cameron333 (3.91%)
|
|Bonnie Collins (Com) 55 (0.66%)
||
|Moe Amery
|-
|bgcolor=whitesmoke|Calgary-Egmont
||
|Jonathan Denis5,415 (43.61%)
|
|Cathie Williams3,289 (26.49%)
|
|Jason Nishiyama447 (3.60%)
|
|Barry Chase676 (5.44%)
|
|Mark McGillvray582 (4.69%)
|
|Craig Chandler (Ind.)2,008 (16.17%)
||
|Denis Herard
|-
|bgcolor=whitesmoke|Calgary-Elbow
||
|Alison Redford6,130 (42.08%)
|
|Craig Cheffins5,711 (39.20%)
|
|Garnet Wilcox290 (1.99%)
|
|Dale Nelson963 (6.61%)
|
|Jonathon Sheffield526 (3.61%)
|
|Barry Erskine (Ind)948 (6.51%)
||
|Craig Cheffins
|-
|bgcolor=whitesmoke|Calgary-Fish Creek
||
|Heather Forsyth6,884 (52.30%)
|
|Laura Shutiak4,038 (30.68%)
|
|Eric Leavitt423 (3.22%)
|
|Jamie Buchan1,261 (9.58%)
|
|Kerry Fraser556 (4.22%)
|
| 
||
|Heather Forsyth
|-
|bgcolor=whitesmoke|Calgary-Glenmore
||
|Ron Stevens6,436 (50.67%)
|
|Avalon Roberts4,213 (33.17%)
|
|Holly Heffernan477 (3.76%)
|
|Ryan Sadler1,025 (8.07%)
|
|Arden Bonokoski550 (4.33%)
|
|
||
|Ron Stevens
|-
|bgcolor=whitesmoke|Calgary-Mountain View
|
|Leah Lawrence4,252 (30.91%)
||
|David Swann7,086 (51.51%)
|
|John Donovan661 (4.81%)
|
|Cory Morgan892 (6.48%)
|
|Juliet Burgess865 (6.29%)
|
|
||
|David Swann
|-
|bgcolor=whitesmoke|Calgary-North Hill
||
|Kyle Fawcett4,281 (38.22%)
|
|Pat Murray3,573 (31.99%)
|
|John Chan1,381 (12.36%)
|
|Jane Morgan976 (8.74%)
|
|Kevin Maloney732 (6.55%)
|
|Jim Wright (SC) 228 (2.04%)
||
|Richard Magnus
|-
|bgcolor=whitesmoke|Calgary-Nose Hill
||
|Neil Brown4,586 (49.24%)
|
|Len Borowski2,761 (29.65%)
|
|Tristan Ridley388 (4.17%)
|
|John Murdoch954 (10.24%)
|
|Nick Burman624 (6.70%)
|
|
||
|Neil Brown
|-
|bgcolor=whitesmoke|Calgary-Varsity
|
|Jennifer Diakiw5,353 (36.69%)
||
|Harry B. Chase6,907 (47.33%)
|
|Tim Stock-Bateman530 (3.63%)
|
|Brennan Ltyle1,043 (7.15%)
|
|Sean Maw758 (5.19%)
|
|
||
|Harry B. Chase
|}

References

References

Early 07' Vote predicted, Calgary Sun June 11, 2006
Raj Pannu not running again, and predicts spring 2007 vote CBC news June 14, 2006
Alberta Votes 2008: Promise tracker, cbc.ca, accessed February 22, 2008

Works cited

External links
2008 Alberta General Election | Mapleleafweb.com
DemocraticSPACE Alberta 2008 Coverage
Elections Alberta
Election Almanac - Alberta Provincial Election
What is my Riding?
Alberta Election Predictor 2008

2008
2008 elections in Canada
2008 in Alberta
March 2008 events in Canada